Godehard Giese (born 1972) is a German actor, known for his roles in Deutschland 83. and Babylon Berlin.

Life  
Giese attended Sankt-Ansgar-Schule in Hamburg in his childhood. He studied at Berlin University of the Arts from 1997 to 2000. From 2001 to 2003 he worked as an actor at a theatre in Hildesheim.
He came out as gay in February 2021.

Selected filmography
Breaking Horizons (2012)
The Book Thief (2013)
 (2015)
A Cure for Wellness (2016)
Alone in Berlin (2016)
 Liebmann (2016)
Transit (2018)
All My Loving (2019)
I Was, I Am, I Will Be (2019)
 Bones and Names (2023)

Selected television
Der Kriminalist (2011)
Deutschland 83 (2015)
Schuld nach Ferdinand von Schirach (2015)
Babylon Berlin (2017-)
The Same Sky (2017)

References

External links

1972 births
Living people
German male film actors
German male television actors
Male actors from Hamburg
People educated at the Sankt-Ansgar-Schule
German gay actors